Nakhlestan Rural District is a rural district (dehestan) in the Central District of Khur and Biabanak County, Isfahan Province, Iran. At the 2006 census, its population was 2,396, in 740 families.  The rural district has 14 villages.

References 

Rural Districts of Isfahan Province
Khur and Biabanak County